Shivaraj Sharanappa Sajjanar is an Indian politician from the Bharatiya Janata Party who was the member of Karnataka Legislative Council representing Dharwad Local Authorities constituency.

Political Career 
Shivaraj contested 2004 Karnataka election from Haveri and emerged victorious against Basavaraj Shivannanavar. However Haveri became a reserved seat after delimitation and hence he didn't contest 2008 Karnataka election. He was then elected to Karnataka Legislative Council from Dharwad Local Authorities after the seat fell vacant due to Basavaraj Bommai's election to Shiggaon (Assembly constituency). He quit the BJP and joined B. S. Yediyurappa led Karnataka Janata Paksha and contested from Byadgi seat in 2013 Karnataka election and lost to Basavaraj Shivannanavar of Indian National Congress. He was named BJP candidate for the by-polls to the Hangal (Vidhana Sabha constituency) which were necessitated after the death of the sitting MLA C. M. Udasi. He was defeated by Srinivas Mane of Congress by a margin of 7373 votes.

References 

Living people
1959 births